Jirandeh is a city in Gilan Province, Iran.

Jirandeh may refer to:
 Jirandeh, Qazvin
 Jirandeh Rural District, in Gilan Province, Iran